The Canadian province of Manitoba held municipal elections on October 25, 2006.

Brandon

Jeff Harwood is a teacher in Brandon.  He was a councillor for the city's second ward in the 1980s, and represented Brandon before the Royal Commission on National Passenger Transportation in 1990.  Following the events of September 11, 2001, Harwood wrote a piece supporting increased border security and an "increased role for our Armed Forces in national security".  He wrote a public letter in support of the Progressive Conservative Party of Canada in 2002.  The following year, he criticized Prime Minister Jean Chrétien for not supporting the United States of America in the 2003 invasion of Iraq.

Ken Fitzpatrick is an information system manager.  He was first elected for Brandon's seventh ward in a 1999 by-election, after the previous member, Scott Smith, was elected to the Legislative Assembly of Manitoba.  Fitzpatrick left the council in 2002, but was returned in 2006.

Electors could vote for eight candidates.

The percentages are determined in relation to the total number of votes.

Brian Mayes was born in Winnipeg, Manitoba.  He holds a Bachelor of Public Administration degree from Carleton University (1984), and Master of Industrial Relations (1988) and Bachelor of Laws (2001) degrees from the University of Toronto.  He ran for the Toronto City Council's thirteenth ward in 1991 as a New Democratic Party candidate, campaigning on a platform of affordable rental housing and police foot patrols on Bloor Street.  He lost to John Adams.  Mayes also worked as a representative of the Ontario Public Service Employees Union in this period, and was a vocal opponent of the Social Contract legislation introduced by Bob Rae's government.  In 1993, he negotiated a pact for 1,000 OPSEU workers to avoid a wage freeze and unpaid holidays.  He sought election to the Toronto City Council again in 1997, and was unsuccessful.  As of 2006, he operates a private law practice in Brandon.  He has served on the boards of Brandon University and the Workers Compensation Board of Manitoba.  He was first elected to the Brandon School Board in 2006.
Alexander James Murray is a hairstylist.  He was first elected to the Brandon School Division in 1995, and was re-elected in 1998, 2002 and 2006.  He served as chair of the board in his second term, and was part of a majority of trustees who argued against service cuts during the budget negotiations of 1998 and 1999.  In 2000, he endorsed a tax increase designed to improve the division's teacher-to-student ratio.  He declined to initiate merger talks with neighbouring rural school boards in 2001, due to concerns that Brandon would be seen as taking over other divisions.  In 2003, he was elected unopposed to a one-year term as a vice-president of the Manitoba Association of School Trustees.  He was chosen as chairperson of the Brandon board once again after the 2006 election.
Peter Bartlette worked as an instructor in Brandon schools for 32 years before his election in 2006.  He was self-employed at the time of the election, and campaigned on a platform of "visible, accountable management".
Bea Jolly is a retired educator.  She holds a Class 3 Childcare Certificate and a Permanent Special and Vocational Education Certificate.  She taught in the United Kingdom from 1949 to 1967, and in Brandon from 1967 to 1996.  Her husband, Malcolm Jolly, was a member of the Brandon School Board from 1992 until his death in 2003.  She was first elected to the Brandon School Board in 2006, running on a platform of defending the public school system.
Linda L. Ross holds a Ph.D. in Psychology from the University of Manitoba (1985).  She was Director of the Agency Behavioral Consultation project at Surrey Place Centre in Toronto from 1985 to 1987, when she joined the Department of Psychology at Brandon University.  In 1997, she was appointed acting Dean of the Department.  She was first elected to the Brandon School Board in a 1993 by-election, and was re-elected in 1995, 1998, 2002 and 2006.  She served as board chair during her second term.  In 1998, she accused provincial Education Minister Linda McIntosh of undermining the quality of education in Manitoba by withholding adequate financial support.  During the 1990s, she chaired the steering committee for a first nations and aboriginal counselling program at Brandon University.
Ramona Coey has an advanced degree in applied economics, and has worked in banking and small business.  She was first elected to the Brandon School Board in 2006.
George Buri has over 30 years' experience as a public school teacher.  He was first elected to the Brandon School Board in 2006.
Wayne Langlois is a provincial assessment officer, and a frequent candidate for public office.  He ran for Mayor of Brandon in 1998, centring his campaign on an opposition to property tax increases.  He later ran for the seventh ward council seat in a 1999 by-election, and ran again for the same position in 2002.  Langlois also sought the federal New Democratic Party nomination for Brandon—Souris in 2000, but lost to Errol Black.  He received a community service award from the provincial government in 2003, for his work with organizations such as the John Howard Society and Housing for the Physically Challenged.

Rural Municipality of Elton

Sources: Unofficial results of nominations for the Rural Municipality of Elton, 19 September 2006, Election returns for the Rural Municipality of Elton, 26 October 2006 (lists winning candidates).

Neepawa

Robert G. Durston has a Bachelor of Science degree in Agriculture from the University of Manitoba.  He is a retired provincial agriculture representative, and was a veteran councillor before he first ran for mayor in the 1998 election.  Narrowly defeated on that occasion by Ken Waddell, Durston was successful in a 2002 rematch.  Shortly after his election, Durston called for Manitoba's smoking ban to be determined at the provincial election, rather than by individual municipalities.  There was a threat of mass layoffs at Neepawa's Springhill Farms hog processing plant during his first term, though a loan from the Manitoba Industrial Opportunities Program ultimately saved the jobs.  In late 2003, Durston convinced the Association of Manitoba Municipalities to pass a motion calling for stricter testing standards on bottled water.  Re-elected in 2006, he announced the creation of a new personal-care home in the community in June 2007.  Later in the same year, he welcomed the decision of Hytek Ltd. to expand Springfield Farms and create 200 new jobs.

Electors could votes for six candidates.

Pinawa

Electors could vote for four candidates.
The percentages are determined in relation to the total number of votes.

Portage la Prairie

Selkirk

Electors could votes for six candidates.
Percentages are determined in relation to the total number of votes.
Source:  City of Selkirk, website accessed 31 August 2007.

Patricia Pruden was an LPN for 31 years at the Selkirk & District General Hospital, before her retirement in 2003.  She was first elected to the Selkirk City Council in 2002, and was appointed to the Interlake Regional Health Authority in 2004.  She was re-elected in 2006.

Steinbach

These are the elected officials only, information at time of addition was limited to the 6 elected councilors.

Winnipeg

Mayoral race

City council
Elected councillors

Mayoral races across the province

Dauphin

East St. Paul
(Race for reeve)

Flin Flon

Hanover
(For reeve)

Macdonald
(Race for reeve)

Morden

RM of Portage la Parairie
(Race for reeve)

Rockwood
(Race for reeve)

Springfield
(for reeve)

Stanley
(Race for reeve)

St. Clements
(for reeve)

Steinbach

St. Andrews
(for reeve)

Taché
(for reeve)

The Pas

Thompson

Winkler

Footnotes

External links
Association of Manitoba Municipalities - Election 2006

2006 elections in Canada
Municipal elections in Manitoba
2006 in Manitoba
October 2006 events in Canada